The 1978 Missouri Valley Conference men's basketball tournament was held February 27–March 5; the first two rounds were played on campus sites with the semifinal and final contested at the Omaha Civic Auditorium in Omaha, Nebraska, hosted by Creighton University.

In a battle of conference newcomers, top-seeded  defeated third-seeded  in the title game, 54–52, to win their first MVC tournament title.

The Bluejays, in turn, received a bid to the 1978 NCAA tournament.

Format
With the addition of Creighton and Indiana State to the MVC, the tournament field increased from seven to nine. 

With all teams seeded based on regular season conference records, the highest-seeded team received a triple-bye to the championship game. The remaining eight teams were placed into the first round of traditional eight-team single-elimination bracket, pairings based on seed. The winner of this preliminary bracket would then face the top seed in the title game.

Bracket

Preliminary rounds
{{3RoundBracket-Byes 
| RD1    = First roundMonday, February 27Campus Sites
| RD2    = Second roundWednesday, March 1Campus Sites
| RD3    = SemifinalFriday, March 3Omaha Civic Auditorium

| RD1-seed1=2
| RD1-team1= *
| RD1-score1=59
| RD1-seed2=9
| RD1-team2=| RD1-score2=75| RD1-seed3=4
| RD1-team3= *
| RD1-score3=76| RD1-seed4=7
| RD1-team4=
| RD1-score4=75

| RD1-seed5=3
| RD1-team5= *
| RD1-score5=90| RD1-seed6=8
| RD1-team6=
| RD1-score6=71

| RD1-seed7=5
| RD1-team7= *
| RD1-score7=75| RD1-seed8=6
| RD1-team8=
| RD1-score8=71

| RD2-seed1=9
| RD2-team1=Drake
| RD2-score1=73
| RD2-seed2=4
| RD2-team2=New Mexico State *
| RD2-score2=90| RD2-seed3=3
| RD2-team3=Indiana State *
| RD2-score3=88| RD2-seed4=5
| RD2-team4=Bradley
| RD2-score4=81

| RD3-seed1=4
| RD3-team1=New Mexico State
| RD3-score1=78 2OT
| RD3-seed2=3
| RD3-team2=Indiana State| RD3-score2=80}}Note''': * indicates host institution

Championship

References

Missouri Valley Conference men's basketball tournament
1977–78 Missouri Valley Conference men's basketball season
1978 in sports in Nebraska